Emperor of the Sea (literally "Sea God") is a South Korean television drama series starring Choi Soo-jong, Chae Shi-ra, Song Il-kook، Soo Ae and Chae Jung-an It aired on KBS2 from November 24, 2004, to May 25, 2005, on Wednesdays and Thursdays at 21:55 for 51 episodes. The period drama is based on Choi In-ho's 2003 novel Hae-sin, which depicts the life of Jang Bogo, who rises from a lowly slave to a powerful maritime figure who dominated the East Asia seas and international trade during the Unified Silla dynasty.

The series was received extremely well, holding the number one spot in the ratings for majority of the weeks it aired.

The filming set in Wando County, South Jeolla Province also became a tourist attraction.

Plot
Jang Bogo (Choi Soo-jong) rises from a lowly slave to the military commander of the sea during the Unified Silla dynasty. Along the way, he battles pirates, and engages in a heated rivalry with Madam Jami (Chae Shi-ra), a Silla noble who squares off against Jang Bogo for trade rights in the South Sea. Yeom Jang (Song Il-gook), Jang Bogo's charismatic comrade, supports Jang in his ascension to become the "Emperor of the Sea." But Yeom Jang competes with Jang Bogo for the love of Lady Jung-hwa (Soo Ae).

Cast 
Choi Soo-jong as Jang Bogo/Gungbok 
Baek Sung-hyun as young Gungbok
Jang Bogo is an historical figure who virtually dominated the seas of the East Asia (hence name "Sea God" or "Emperor of the Sea") and international trade from Tang China and Japan to the North China sea during the time of Unified Silla dynasty.
Gungbok starts from lowest social class as a slave on the docks of Cheonghae. Gungbok lost his mother to pirates when he was young. His father was a slave carpenter in Police Office of Cheonghae. Working hard in the rough dock, Gungbok soon masters the sea and has the knack of building ships. Faced with challenges, he becomes calmer and bolder. Both Gungbok and his mate Nyeon learn martial arts from certain Choi Moo-chang. Such abilities helped him to rise from a gladiator to a security guard, military head of Muryongun and then ambassador of Cheonghae. As a part of this, he eliminated the pirates by installing Cheonghaejin on Wando, which is a geographically important sea route. With his clever battle strategies, he is able to defeat the army led by Madam Jami and install the true ruler of Korea. However, even after repeated requests by the king, he refuses the high positions. After the king is assassinated by the cunning Kim Yang, he prepares the army to lead a final assault and remove the corrupt ministers appointed by Kim Yang.
At the end, Consul Jang Bogo is fatally stabbed in his office with a concealed knife by Yeom Jang. Jang Bogo accepts his death without any resistance, and his body is found at midnight by Nyeon, Choi Moo-chang and Jung-hwa. Even after his death, his army fights to the last man as a mark of respect.

Chae Shi-ra as Madam Jami
A Silla noble and businesswoman. She first plays a role in Lady Jung-hwa's destiny. But as the story progresses, her grudges towards Jang Bogo leads to her downfall, and her life ends in tragedy.

Song Il-kook as Yeom Jang/Yeom Moon 
Hong Hyun-ki as young Yeom Moon
Raised by pirates, young Yeom Moon brandished short knives with remarkable skill and accuracy. Later in the story, he is captured by Jang Bogo, and receives the harshest punishment of branding as a pirate, and his forehead bears the burn mark. He is eventually released from prison by Kim Yang. For this, he trains Kim Yang's men in martial arts and leads the assault against Madam Jami's men, when they temporarily reconcile with Jang Bogo. He is later appointed the head of the king's bodyguards. With war looming against Jang Bogo, he visits Cheonghae to defuse the situation. He promises Kim Yang that if the need arises, he will assassinate him, provided Kim spares Jang Bogo's wife (daughter of Jang Bogo's trade master) and their new born child,  Jung-hwa and the people of Silla. During their meeting, he tries his best to deviate Jang from his attack, but Jang has made up his mind to put an end to the ineffective and corrupt ministers in the king's council. In the end, he betrays Jang Bogo and kills him. He receives a jolt after the assassination, when Kim Yang launches an attack on Silla. Imprisoned by Kim Yang, he escapes from custody and helps Jung-hwa escape the massacre with Jang Bogo's child. He is killed by a shower of arrows fired by Kim Yang's army.

Soo Ae as Jung-hwa 
Lee Yeon-hee as young Jung-hwa
Love interest of Jang Bogo and Yeom Jang for most of the series. The mere mention of her name is enough for Jang Bogo to abandon careful consideration (which is his modus operandi) and act in a frenzied manner, without regards for the consequences.

Extended cast

 Kim Heung-soo as Jung Nyeon
 Ahn Jae-hong as young Jung Nyeon
 Park Yeong-gyu as Seol-pyeong
 Chae Jung-an as Lady Chae-ryeong
 Kim Ah-joong as Baek Ha-jin
 Lee Won-jong as Choi Moo-chang
 Kim Kap-soo as Lee Do-hyeong
 Jo Dal-hwan as Lee Soon-jong 
 Heo In-beom as young Soon-jong
 Jung Sung-hwan as Chang-kyeom (Jung-hwa's brother)
 Lee Hee-do as Mak Bong (Soon-jong's father)
 Kang Sung-pil as Jong Dal
 Jung Ho-keun as Dae Chi
 Park Jung-hak as Neung Chang
 Go Do-young as Da Bok
 Lee Eun-hye as young Da Bok
 Kil Yong-woo as King Shinmu
 Seo Do-young as Moo Jin (Jung-hwa's bodyguard)
 Choi Sang-gil as Cheon Tae
 Kim Hyo-won as Yoo Ja-seong
 Lee Jae-yong as Master Jo Sang-gil
 Kim Hyung-bum as Tae-bong (Jami's security officer)
 Do Ki-suk as Jang Seong-pil
 Bae Soo-bin as Kim Yang
 Go Myung-hwan as Pan Sool (one of Master Yi's men)
 Yeo Ho-min as Baek Kyung (Yeom Jang's subordinate)
 Park In-hwan as Bogo's father (Eps. 1–2)
 Seo Jin-wook
 Bae Seul-ki
 Lee Ji-eun
 Seo Bum-yul 
 Jo Seung-yeon 
 Kim Byung-gi 
 Song Ji-eun
 Seo Bum-shik
 Baek So-mi
 Kim Sung-hoon
 Shim Eun-kyung

Ratings 
The series was a huge success, gaining between 28.5 and 30.0% of viewers.

Awards and nominations
2005 International Emmy Awards
Drama series in the Asia, Africa and Middle East region - Final Round Nomination

2005 KBS Drama Awards 
Top Excellence Award, Actor: Choi Soo-jong
Excellence Award, Actress: Soo Ae
Excellence Award, Actor: Song Il-gook
Popularity Award, Actor: Song Il-gook
Best Couple Award: Song Il-gook and Soo Ae

2006 1st Seoul International Drama Awards
Runner-up, Best Series Drama
Best Cinematographer: Kim Seung-hwan

See also 
 List of Korean television shows
 Contemporary culture of South Korea
 History of Korea
 Unified Silla

References

External links 
  
 Emperor of the Sea at KBS World
 

Korean Broadcasting System television dramas
2004 South Korean television series debuts
2005 South Korean television series endings
South Korean historical television series
Television series set in Silla
Television shows based on South Korean novels
Television series by Kim Jong-hak Production